Love Marie Payawal Ongpauco-Escudero (born February 14, 1985), known professionally as Heart Evangelista (alternately ), is a Filipino actress, artist, businesswoman, and socialite.

Early life
Heart Evangelista was born as Love Marie Payawal Ongpauco on February 14, 1985, in Manila, to Reynaldo Evangelista Ongpauco, a Filipino businessman, and Maria Cecilia del Gallego Payawal. Evangelista is the youngest child in her family, with siblings from both sides of her parents. Her aunt is 1960s superstar Liberty Ilagan. She was born in the Philippines and moved to the U.S. before returning to her homeland in her early teens. She started her career at age 13 as a model and actress.

Career

2000–2004
From 2000 to early 2004, she was paired with John Prats on the show G-mik, Trip, Ang Tanging Ina, My First Romance and Berks. During the success of their loveteam, they won as the (Most Popular Loveteams of RP movies) of 2003, from 33rd Guillermo Mendoza Memorial Scholarship Foundation. Evangelista also won the Best New Female Personality (Best New Movie Actress and Best New TV Actress) awards from Star Awards for Movies and Star Awards for TV. She also won Texter's and Listener's Choice at the Himig Handog Awards for her single "Love Has Come My Way". She released the single "Tell Me" in Australia where it peaked at number 18 on the charts.

2004–2007
In 2004, after four years, Prats and Evangelista's popular real and reel tandem ended and the management decided to pair her with Geoff Eigenmann in the movie Bcuz of U. Both of them also appeared on the TV series Hiram, with co-stars Kris Aquino, Dina Bonnevie and Anne Curtis for which she earned a Star Awards Best Actress nomination.

In 2005, Jericho Rosales once mentioned Heart's name, saying that he wanted her to be his leading lady in the series Panday. There were many women who auditioned for this role, but they chose Heart to play the role of Eden, the love interest of Tristan. Their tandem turned into a serious relationship and lasted 3 years.

In early 2007, she renewed her ties with ABS-CBN and was under a per project basis with her manager Angeli Pangilinan Valenciano. She finished a sineserye for the station, the remake of the movie Hiram na Mukha, and appeared briefly on Pangarap Na Bituin. She also starred in the reformatted version of Your Song under the title "Muntik Na Kitang Minahal".

2008–present: Transfer to GMA Network

In early 2008, she signed a GMA Artist Center exclusive contract under GMA Network and she started her first show Codename: Asero as a leading lady of Richard Gutierrez.

She played a role as one of the twins in the fantaserye Luna Mystika. Evangelista also appeared on her first afternoon TV soap Sine Novela: Ngayon at Kailanman which aired its final episode in September 2009. In late 2009 – early 2010, she starred in a primetime Koreanovela TV series, Full House. Evangelista hosts the musical variety show on GMA, Party Pilipinas.

She appeared in the Christmas reality show Puso ng Pasko: Artista Challenge on GMA Network, and she played a dwarf on Dwarfina. On late 2011, she signed an exclusive contract under Viva Entertainment.

In 2012, she starred alongside actresses Alessandra De Rossi and Lovi Poe in the TV series Legacy which became a highly acclaimed television series throughout its run. She also was included in the afternoon drama Forever opposite co-star Geoff Eigennmann. She then started her next project on Luna Blanca Book 3 onwards till its finale. The show is a sequel of her last soap Luna Mystika in 2008 of the same genre and in 2013, she was reunited with De Rossi in the Afternoon soap Magkano Ba ang Pag-ibig? under the direction of Maryo J. de los Reyes. In 2015, she and Legacy co-star Lovi Poe were reunited in the soap Beautiful Strangers, a melodrama. This was Evangelista's second time working with veteran actress Dina Bonnevie in a series with a huge ensemble cast. In 2016, she was reunited with Dwarfina co-star Dennis Trillo in the Primetime Rom Com Juan Happy Love Story. In September 2016, Evangelista experienced a series of depression after the passing of her mentor and 'close friend', former senator Miriam Defensor Santiago.

In 2017, Evangelista starred in Mulawin vs. Ravena. She also starred in My Korean Jagiya, paired with former U-KISS member Alexander Lee Eusebio. The show aired with a total of 105 episodes. During the 2018 State of the Nation Address in the Philippine Congress, Evangelista wore the iconic rainbow badge in support for equality in the Philippines and the passage of the pro-LGBT SOGIE Equality Bill.

She was featured by Kevin Kwan's Real Crazy Rich Asians while staying in Paris during a high couture week. Evangelista was one of People Asia's "People of the Year 2018–2019". In 2019, she served as a judge on the seventh season of the reality talent television show StarStruck. Evangelista then portrayed a Sorsogon fashion designer and socialite Celeste in the television drama romance series I Left My Heart in Sorsogon (2021–2022).

Visual artist
As an accomplished painter, Evangelista had sold out solo exhibitions from various galleries such as the Ayala Museum and Galerie Joaquin. She uses her real name, Love Marie, in her paintings. Her first solo exhibition was held at the Ayala Museum in 2014, entitled I am Love Marie: The Art and Works of Love Marie Ongpauco. On the same year, she participated in the Visual Arts Festival through the Focus on the Arts: Art in Transit exhibitions. She also held her second solo exhibition on the same year at Galerie Joaquin through her Love Marie gallery. Her third solo exhibition, Love Marie: A Solo Exhibition of a World Class Filipina, was held at the Raffles Hotel's Chan Hampe Calleries in Singapore in 2015. She also collaborated with Rocio Olbes's children's book, Daughter of the Sun and the Moon, and participated in the Art Fair Philippines 2015: maARTe and PortrAYAL (LAYA): Portraits for Freedom Big & Small Art Co.

In 2016, she collaborated with designer Mark Bumgarner through the LMxMB: when art meets fashion, as well as with A.A. Patawaran through the book HaiNAku and other poems. Her fourth solo exhibition was held at the Ayala Museum through her Oceans Apart gallery. Her iconic hand painted bags were also introduced on the same year at BMW BGC through her exhibition, Carry your heART. In 2017, she again collaborated with A.A. Patawan at the S Maison Conrad Hotel through the HaiNAku 1st Anniversary Exhibit. She also held, HEART & Style, a public exhibition of works of art at Fashion Hall of SM Mega Mall. In April 2018, she launched another art exhibit at ArtistSpace Gallery of the Ayala Museum. On the same year, she again collaborated with A.A. Patawaran through the book, Manila Was A Long Time Ago, which featured her pet dog named Panda. Her "Follow Your Heart" artwork was featured in the February 2019 US edition of Harper's Bazaar.

Charity and advocacy
Her foundation Heart Can aims to help children with respiratory diseases. Her foundation has been active since its inception and has helped thousands of children with special needs. Heart is also an LGBT ally and a recipient of Lagablab Network's Equality Champion Award in the Philippines, being a strong supporter for the passage of the SOGIE Equality Bill, which provides protections on the basis of sexual orientation, gender identity, and expression. A known international painter, Heart is also active in the artistic community, notably in Asia. She is also a spokesperson for PAWS or (Philippine Animal Welfare Society), launching various campaigns for the organization such as the Have a Heart for Aspins campaign. She admitted in an interview that she was traumatized at a young age after seeing their neighbor slaughtering some dogs. When they told the authorities about the killings, her report was just made fun of. Heart has also been supporting the Balikatan Thalassemia for children with rare diseases, Corridor of Hope for children with cancer and the Cerebral Palsy Association of Sorsogon where her husband hails from.

Filmography

Television series

Drama anthology

Television shows

Film

Theater

Discography

Studio albums

Compilation albums

Music videos

Art exhibits and collaborations

Awards and nominations

Personal life
Evangelista dated actors John Prats from 1999 to 2004, Jericho Rosales in 2005, and Daniel Matsunaga in 2010.

Evangelista is married to Senator Francis "Chiz" Escudero. The pair were introduced by Evangelista's 'mentor', the late senator Miriam Defensor Santiago, who was a close friend of her mother. On February 15, 2015, the couple wed in a private ceremony at the Balesin Island Club in the Philippines. It was in the same year that Evangelista adopted a puppy saved by her father from the streets of Batangas. She named the puppy Panda, also sometimes referred to as Panpan. In May 2018, Evangelista and Escudero announced the expectation of their twins; however, she subsequently suffered a miscarriage that lost them. She assumed the role of first lady of Sorsogon on June 30, 2019.

Heart has been sighted in Paris, living and working in the city amidst rumors that she split from her husband in 2022.

References

External links
 
 
 Sparkle profile

1985 births
Living people
Filipino child actresses
Filipino child singers
Filipino women artists
Filipino people of Chinese descent
Fashion influencers
People from Makati
Actresses from Cavite
20th-century Filipino actresses
21st-century Filipino actresses
VJs (media personalities)
Filipino television variety show hosts
GMA Network personalities
ABS-CBN personalities
Star Magic
Viva Artists Agency
Spouses of politicians
21st-century Filipino singers
21st-century Filipino women singers
Filipino bloggers
Filipino women bloggers
Filipino expatriates in France